Dermott, Arkansas is a city in Chicot County, Arkansas, United States.

Dermott may also refer to:

People with the given name
 Dermott Downs (born 1962), an American television director, actor, producer and cinematographer
 Dermott Petty, an independent filmmaker from Ireland
 Dermott Lennon (born 1969), an equestrian from Northern Ireland
 Dermott Brereton (born 1964), a former professional Australian rules football player
 Dermott Monteith (1943–2009), an Irish international cricketer

Surname
 Kim Dermott, a former association football player from New Zealand
 Beau Dermott (born 2003), a British musical theatre singer
 Blake Dermott (born 1961), a former professional Canadian football offensive lineman for the Edmonton Eskimos
 Martin Dermott (born 1967), an English former professional rugby league footballer
 Travis Dermott (born 1996), a Canadian professional ice hockey defenceman
 Laurence Dermott (1720–1791), an Irish Freemason

Other uses
 3647 Dermott, an asteroid

See also 
 McDermott